Ganshoren is one of the 19 municipalities of the Brussels-Capital Region, Belgium. Located in the north-western part of the region, it is bordered by Berchem-Sainte-Agathe, Jette, and Koekelberg, as well as the Flemish municipality of Asse. In common with all of Brussels' municipalities, it is legally bilingual (French–Dutch).

, the municipality had a population of 25,252 inhabitants.

In 2018, Pierre Kompany was elected mayor of Ganshoren. He is the first black mayor in Belgium, and the father of footballer Vincent Kompany.

References

Notes

External links
 
 Archives Municipality Ganshoren

 
Municipalities of the Brussels-Capital Region
Populated places in Belgium